Juan Chioran (born June 18, 1963) is an Argentine-Canadian actor primarily associated with stage roles at the Stratford Shakespeare Festival in Canada. He is based in Stratford, Ontario.

Chioran is also known for his voice acting roles, such as Doji in Beyblade: Metal Fusion (the first 32 episodes, succeeded by Andrew Jackson), King Caradoc in Jane and the Dragon, and Barry Bullevardo in the animated series Iggy Arbuckle.

Stratford Shakespeare Festival credits
Chioran has played these major stage roles at the Stratford Shakespeare Festival:

 The Adventures of Pinocchio (1986) by Carlo Collodi — Father (ep. 6, 14, 21, 29)
 The Mikado (1993) by Gilbert and Sullivan — Poo-Bah
 Man of La Mancha (1998) by Dale Wasserman — Don Quixote
 The Winter's Tale (1998) by William Shakespeare — Polixenes
 Dracula: A Chamber Musical (1999) — Count Dracula
 A Midsummer Night's Dream (1999) by William Shakespeare — Oberon
 As You Like It (2000) by William Shakespeare — Jaques
 Hamlet (2000) by William Shakespeare — Gravedigger
 All's Well That Ends Well (2008) by William Shakespeare — Parolles
 Bartholomew Fair (2009) by Ben Jonson — Zeal-of-the-land Busy
 The Three Sisters (2009) by Anton Chekhov — Solyony
 Evita (2010) by Arthur Laurents — Juan Perón
 Kiss Me, Kate (2010) based on a play by William Shakespeare — Fred Graham
 The Misanthrope (2011) by Molière — Philinte
 Twelfth Night (2011) by William Shakespeare — Fabian
 Much Ado About Nothing (2012) by William Shakespeare — Don Pedro
 Henry V (2012) by William Shakespeare — Montjoy

Film and television
Chioran has had various film and television roles, including Lance Boil on Grossology. He also played the role of Francobollo Garibaldi, the father of Raven-Symoné's character in the Disney Channel Original Movie, The Cheetah Girls in 2003. In Cyberchase Season 3, he was the voice of Nero The Animal Hero, and the voice of "Art Wurst" on Detentionaire. He also played Laurie in The Perfect Son film in 2000 and Venomous Drool in Fangbone!. In Totally Spies!, he voiced the uncredited role of Ice Cream Man in the episode "Evil Ice Cream Man Much?". He was Snow Miser in the 2008 movie A Miser Brothers Christmas and Mr. Mansour in Miss BG. He is known for his work on the CGI series PAW Patrol, where he voiced Raimundo the Ringmaster. He also voices Señor Tapir, a Mexican-born musical tapir who appears in Elinor Wonders Why.

Awards and nominations
Chioran won a Gemini Award for Best Performance in a Performing Arts Program or Series in 2000 for a televised showing of his portrayal of Count Dracula in Dracula: A Chamber Musical. He was nominated for a 2007 Joseph Jefferson Award for Actor in a Supporting Role in a Musical for The Three Musketeers at the Chicago Shakespeare Theater in Chicago, Illinois.

Video clips
TorontoStage.com interview for "The Madonna Painter"

External links

References

1963 births
Living people
Argentine emigrants to Canada
Argentine male film actors
Argentine male stage actors
Canadian male film actors
Canadian male stage actors
Canadian male voice actors
Canadian people of Argentine descent
Canadian Screen Award winners
Place of birth missing (living people)